Alfred William Stephens Cross (1858–1932) was a British architect.

From 1889 to 1899 he was in partnership with Henry Spalding as Spalding and Cross, taking part in many competitions for building design. Cross and his son (Kenneth Mervyn Baskerville Cross, 1890–1968) became specialised in designs for public baths.

Designs

Public Baths

Dulwich Baths 1890 (open 1891)
Hampstead Baths 1891
Camberwell Baths 1892
Coventry Baths 1890s-1966
Haggerston Baths, Hackney 1904
Marshall Street Baths (or Westminster Baths) 1931
Public Baths Finsbury 1931

Public Baths Clyde Street Deptford
Hoxton Baths
Seymour Place Baths Marylebone
Walthamstow Baths
Wandsworth Baths
Additions to St John's College Cambridge

Other works

Almshouses at Wood Green
Remodelling of Stanton Drew Church 1881
Restoration of Market Cross, Cheddar
The Vicarage Easton-in-Gordano 1885
Glendale Clevedon 1887
Two hospitals in the West of England
Finalist in the London County Hall Competition 1908
Headquarters 17th Rifle Volunteers Camden Town 1890
Mission Premises Kentish Town 1891
Congregational Church and School Hall Finchley Road 1891
Church West Hampstead
Church Harlesden
Artisans’ Dwellings Manchester
Schools at  Cricklewood, Hendon, New Barnet and West Hampstead
Municipal College of Technology, Manchester
Gosport Free Library 1900
Portsmouth Technical Institute 1900
Municipal Dye House Manchester 1903 ( part of the Municipal Technical School )
Merchant Venturers’ Technical College Bristol
Edward Davies Memorial Chemistry Laboratories, Aberystwyth University 1905
Restoration of Shoreditch Town Hall 1906
Schools at Finchley, Poplar, Gospel Oak and Kentish Town
Public Library Deptford

Publications

See also 
Oskar Lassar

Notes

References

Sources 

Architects from London
1858 births
1932 deaths